WNJY (89.3 FM) is a radio station licensed to Netcong, New Jersey. The station is owned by New York Public Radio, and is an affiliate of their New Jersey Public Radio network.

WNYC assumed control of the stations that make up NJPR under a management agreement on July 1, 2011.

External links

NJY
Radio stations established in 2008
NPR member stations
New York Public Radio